Facundo Mena (born 22 September 1992) is an Argentine tennis player.

Mena has a career high ATP singles ranking of No. 127 achieved on 12 September 2022. He also has a career high doubles ranking of No. 210 achieved on 26 July 2021.

Mena has won two ATP Challenger singles titles at the 2019 Città di Como Challenger, defeating Andrej Martin in the final and the 2021 Quito Challenger.

ATP Challenger and ITF Futures finals

Singles: 27 (11–16)

Doubles: 32 (15–17)

References

External links
 
 
 

1992 births
Living people
Argentine male tennis players
Tennis players from Buenos Aires
21st-century Argentine people